Martha J. B. Thomas, MBA (13 March 1926 – 16 October 2006) was an American chemical engineer and analytical chemist.

She is particularly known for her work on phosphorus.

Life and education 
Martha Jane Bergin was born in West Roxbury, Boston, on 13 March 1926 to Augusta and John Bergin. As a child she attended Boston Girls Latin School. She graduated cum laude from Radcliffe College in 1945 with a Batheolr of Science degree, after which she obtained a PhD in chemistry from Boston University in 1953, while working at Sylvania Electric Products. Later in life, she received an MBA at Boston's Northeastern University in 1983.

Career and research 
Thomas began her professional career in 1945 at Sylvania Electric Products, where she became the head of the Phosphor Research and Development Section  in 1970. During her time at Sylvania she established their first phosphor pilot plants. She also taught chemistry in Boston University's evening division between 1952 and 1970. She was a director of technical services at GTE Electrical Products Group in Danvers, Massachusetts, US, working for the company for over four decades. During that time she made "23 official improvements in lightbulbs".

Thomas held 24 patents for improving lighting technology and manufacturing, covering, for example, fluorescent lamps and phosphor chemistry. One of her most important contributions was the development of a white phosphorus powder coating for fluorescent tubes creating a much more daylight-like light. She also developed a phosphor-based treatment that increase the brightness of mercury lamps by 10%.

Awards and honours 
Thomas was awarded the Achievement Award of the Society of Women Engineers 1965. The award was given "in recognition of her significant contributions to the science of chemistry as an engineer, educator, and administrator, while fulfilling her duties as a wife and mother." She was an active member of the organisation.

In 1991 she was named the New England Inventor by the Museum of Science in Boston, an award given to individuals "whose application of science and technology, creativity, and independent thought has positively impacted society".

She was the recipient of a Distinguished Alumni Award from Boston University.

Personal life 
Martha Jane Bergin married George Thomas, a government scientist at St Brigid's Church in Millbury on 29 October 1955 and they had four daughters, Augusta, Anne, Abigail and Susan.

On retirement in 1990, the couple moved Westport, Massachusetts, and after her husband's death, Thomas moved to live with her daughter Susan's family in Royal Palm Beach Florida.

Marth J B Thomas died at her home on 16 Oct 2006 at the age of 80. She was buried in Holyhood Cemetery in Brighton Massachusetts.

References 

1926 births
2006 deaths
People from Boston
20th-century American chemists
American chemical engineers
Northeastern University alumni
Boston University alumni
Radcliffe College alumni
People from West Roxbury, Boston
Women chemical engineers